The Crying Game is a 1992 film written and directed by Neil Jordan.

The Crying Game can also refer to:

The Crying Game (novel), a 1968 novel by John Braine
"The Crying Game" (song), a 1964 song by Geoff Stephens
"Cryin' Game", a 1998 song by Sara Evans
Nakige, or "crying game", a subgenre of visual novels